Marolles-en-Hurepoix (literally Marolles in Hurepoix) is a commune in the Essonne department in Île-de-France in northern France.

Population

Inhabitants of Marolles-en-Hurepoix are known as Marollais in French.

See also
Communes of the Essonne department

References

External links

Official website 
Mayors of Essonne Association 

Communes of Essonne